KUNR (88.7 FM) is the flagship National Public Radio station in Reno, Nevada. Owned and operated by the University of Nevada, Reno, it is a typical full-service public radio outlet airing  NPR news and talk.

KUNR signed on in October 1963.  It did not join NPR until 1981. It also serves as Carson City's NPR news affiliate.

Translators
The station operates a full-time satellite, KNCC in Elko, along with 12 translators across Nevada and California.

Nevada Translator's

K210AK 89.9 Incline Village, NV

K215CM 90.9 Eureka, NV

K217AX 91.3 Winnemucca, NV

K218AO 91.5 Hawthorne, NV

K219AR 91.7 Verdi, NV

K220BC 91.9 Yerington, NV

K263AB 100.5 Battle Mountain, NV

California Translator's

K201FV 88.1 Truckee, CA

K215BQ 90.9 Bishop, CA

K220DB 91.9 Susanville, CA (Mono County)

K237DA 95.3 Tom's Place, CA

K248AT 97.5 Crestview, CA

KUNR had a Translator on 101.5 in Crescent Valley, NV but was shutdown.

External links

UNR
Radio stations established in 1963
NPR member stations
1963 establishments in Nevada
UNR
University of Nevada, Reno